Sorang Sompeng script is used to write in Sora, a Munda language with 300,000 speakers in India.  The script was created by Mangei Gomango in 1936 and is used in religious contexts.  He was familiar with Odia, Telugu and English.

The Sora language is also written in the Latin, Odia and Telugu scripts.

Letters
The values of the letters are as follows:

Digits

Gallery

Unicode 
Sorang Sompeng script was added to the Unicode Standard in January, 2012 with the release of version 6.1.

Block

The Unicode block for Sorang Sompeng script, called Sora Sompeng, is U+110D0–U+110FF:

Fonts
Microsoft Windows made a font called Nirmala UI, which supports Sora Sompeng. Google Noto is also making a font, called Noto Sans Sora Sompeng. Here's a beta version of it:

References

Alphabets
Munda scripts
Writing systems introduced in 1936
Constructed scripts